Rich King may refer to:

Rich King (basketball) (born 1969), American basketball player
Rich King (sportscaster) (born 1947), American television sportscaster

See also
Richard King (disambiguation)